The 2009 Missouri Tigers football team, represented the University of Missouri in the 2009 NCAA Division I FBS football season. The team was coached by Gary Pinkel, who returned for his ninth season with Mizzou, and played their home games at Faurot Field at Memorial Stadium. Changes to Memorial Stadium for the 2009 season included a new scoreboard and expanded seating capacity following a reconfiguration of the student seating section.

On December 6, the Texas Bowl picked the 8-4 Tigers to play in their fourth annual game against the 9-4 Navy Midshipmen at Reliant Stadium in Houston on December 31.

On December 22, Mizzou Sports Properties (owned by Learfield Sports) announced a contract for a new radio home on all its coaches' and daily shows for five years, starting with the 2010–11 season. KFRU, owned by Cumulus Media, had the radio rights for the Tiger Network.

Recruits
Key Losses:

DB Castine Bridges
LB Brock Christopher
TE Chase Coffman
QB Chase Daniel
TB Jimmy Jackson
WR Jeremy Maclin
S  William Moore
DL Stryker Sulak
DB Tremane Vaughns
K  Jeff Wolfert
DL Ziggy Hood

23 seniors (not incl. Jeremy Maclin) played their final game in the Alamo Bowl.

25 student-athletes signed a National Letter of Intent to attend the University of Missouri and play football for the Tigers in 2009.

Missouri and Coach Pinkel said they were pleased with its recruits, and Pinkel doesn't listen to how the recruiting services rank his recruits (Scout.com as 38th, Rivals.com as 41st) since they have had great results in the evaluations they look for in the athletes recruited. This year, the breakdown by position in the 25-man class was: five DBs, four LBs, four OLs, four DLs, two QBs, three WRs, two TEs, and one RB. Ten of the 25 are native Missourians.  Pinkel said regarding Missouri's evaluation system: "I was at a national convention and a couple coaches from Texas said to me that we ask more about players, were more thorough, than any coaches that they've seen and any program that they've seen." The recruiting class breaks down to 14 on defense compared to 11 on offense.

Schedule

Roster

Coaching staff

On February 20, 2009, Defensive Coordinator Matt Eberflus announced he was leaving the Tigers to join the Cleveland Browns.

Game summaries

Illinois

Blaine Gabbert passed for three touchdowns and 319 yards (25–33), in a runaway 37–9 victory over rival Illinois.
Missouri WR Danario Alexander posted a career-high with 10 receptions totaling 132 yards. Gabbert became the third straight Missouri quarterback to earn Big 12 Player of the Week honors in his first start.

Bowling Green

After trailing most of the game, Missouri scored 21 unanswered points in the second half to escape at home.

Furman

Nevada

Missouri quarterback Blaine Gabbert posted a career-high 414 yards on 25 of 40 passing.  Missouri wide-out Danario Alexander once again posted career high numbers with 9 catches for 170 yards and 2 touchdowns.  The turning point in this game was when Nevada running back Luke Lippincott fumbled on the Missouri 4 yard line, setting up a 96-yard touchdown drive by the Missouri offense.

Nebraska

Game in the rain ends with a dramatic switch from a 12–0 Missouri lead after the 3rd quarter, changed to a 27–12 loss with an injured Blaine Gabbert's leg for the final half with the first two interceptions of his career.

Oklahoma State

Texas

Kickoff time: 7:12 pm  • End of Game: 10:02  • Total elapsed time: 2:50 
Referee: Tom Walker  •  Umpire: John Mascarello •  Linesman: Chad Green  •  Line judge: David Oliver  •  Back judge: Brad Van Vark  •  Field judge: Reggie Smith  •  Side judge: Brad Horchem  •  Scorer: Tim Knaar  •  
Temperature: 56 F  • Wind: S 5  • Weather: Cool and clear

Colorado

Baylor

Kansas State

Iowa State

Kansas

These rivals put on a show in last year's game and somehow topped it, trading big plays, scores and momentum seemingly with every snap.

Missouri tackled the quarterback for a safety with 2:39 remaining and Grant Ressel hit a 27-yard field goal, his fourth of the game, as time expired, giving the Tigers a 41–39 win over Kansas on Saturday in another wild Border Showdown at Arrowhead Stadium.

Ressel was subsequently named the Big 12 Conference Special Teams Player of the Week, for his perfect day (4-for-4) in field goal kicking. It was the first time since 1972 that a Missouri team has won a game from a field goal kicker after trailing in the final seconds of a game.

Navy (Texas Bowl)

The Tigers lost to Navy in the worst bowl defeat (in terms of the point differential, -22), in team history.

Statistics

Statistics from:

Scores by quarter
(through December 31, 2009)

Team
(to December 31, 2009)

Offense

Rushing
(to December 31, 2009)

Passing
(to December 31, 2009)

Receiving
(to December 31, 2009)

Field Goals/PAT
(to December 31, 2009)

Special teams
(to December 31, 2009)

Interceptions
(to December 31, 2009)

Fumble returns
(to December 31, 2009)

Defense
(to December 31, 2009)

Rankings

(as of January 7, 2010)

References

Missouri
Missouri Tigers football seasons
Missouri Tigers football